Wola Chynowska  is a village in the administrative district of Gmina Chynów, within Grójec County, Masovian Voivodeship, in east-central Poland.

The village has a population of 600.

People born in Wola Chynowska 
Wincenty Szweycer

References

Wola Chynowska